A comparison of Subversion clients includes various aspects of computer software implementations of the client role using the client–server model of the Subversion revision control system.

Descriptions
TortoiseSVN, a Windows shell extension, gives feedback on the state of versioned items by adding overlays to the icons in the Windows Explorer. Repository commands can be executed from the enhanced context menu provided by Tortoise.

SmartSVN provides a similar Explorer integration, but also can be used as a standalone SVN client for different platforms. SmartSVN is available in three different editions: A free Foundation edition with fewer features and two commercial editions called Professional and Enterprise with the full feature set.

Some programmers prefer to have a client integrated within their development environment. Such environments may provide visual feedback of the state of versioned items and add repository commands to the menus of the development environment. Examples of this approach include AnkhSVN, and VisualSVN for use with Microsoft Visual Studio, and Eclipse Subversive

for use with Eclipse Platform IDEs. Delphi XE Subversion integration is built into the Delphi integrated development environment.

It is common to expose Subversion via WebDAV using the Apache web server. In this case, any WebDAV client can be used, but the functionality provided this way may be limited. Alternative ways to serve Subversion include uberSVN and VisualSVN Server.

Subversion clients comparison table

Standalone Subversion clients comparison table

See also 
 Revision control

References 

 Comparison of Subversion clients
Subversion